Snowfall is a compilation album by Keyboardist Yanni, released in 2000. The album peaked at #3 on Billboard's "Top New Age Albums" chart in the same year.

The album was composed of tracks from 1980 to 1993 and released on the label BMG Special Products even though the songs themselves were originally released on Private Music.

Track listing
Beside each track is the song's original album and release year:

References

External links
Official Website

2000 compilation albums
Yanni albums